Arctostaphylos andersonii, the Santa Cruz manzanita, is a species of Arctostaphylos, limited in geography to the Santa Cruz Mountains of California. It grows in openings in redwood forests, usually below 700 meters (2300 feet) elevation.  It was named after Charles Lewis Anderson by Asa Gray.

Description 
Arctostaphylos andersonii is a woody shrub 2–5 m high, which can resemble a small tree. The 4–7 cm smooth leaf blades have serrated edges and deeply lobed bases. It flowers February through May. The fruit is small (2–8 mm) and sticky.

The Santa Cruz manzanita has no basal burl for regrowth and must propagate by seed.

Some populations closer to the Bonny Doon region are highly glaucous (the leaves produce a white, powdery substance on the surface) whereas others are not.

This species is often confused with A. regismontana, A. pallida, and A. pajaroensis, but can be easily identified by geography.

References

External links

Jepson Flora Project: Arctostaphylos andersonii 
USDA Plants Profile: Arctostaphylos andersonii
Arctostaphylos andersonii - Photo gallery

andersonii
Endemic flora of California
Endemic flora of the San Francisco Bay Area
Natural history of the California Coast Ranges
Natural history of Santa Cruz County, California
~
Plants described in 1876